Volzhsky (masculine), Volzhskaya (feminine), or Volzhskoye (neuter) may refer to:
Volzhsky District, name of several districts and city districts in Russia
Volzhsky (inhabited locality) (Volzhskaya, Volzhskoye), name of several inhabited localities in Russia
Volzhskaya (Moscow Metro), a station of the Moscow Metro, Moscow, Russia